Gaël Faye (born 6 August 1982) is a Rwandan-French singer, rapper, and writer.

Personal life 
Faye was born in Bujumbura, Burundi of a French father and Rwandan mother. He emigrated to France at the age of 13, escaping from the Burundian civil war. He studied economics and finance.

He is married and has two daughters.

Book 
Faye wrote a novel inspired by his teenage-years' experience of the war in Burundi. Small Country (Petit Pays) was first published in France in August 2016 by Grasset. It won five literary prizes. It has been translated into 36 languages and made into a movie, released in 2020.

Music 
In 2010, Faye and Edgar Sekloka released a rap and hip-hop album entitled Milk Coffee and Sugar (also the name of their group).

Faye then released three solo albums and one EP: Pili Pili sur un Croissant au Beurre (2013),Des fleurs EP (2014) 
 Lundi Méchant (2020) and Mauve Jacaranda (2022). Lundi Méchant went gold in 2022.

References

1982 births
Rwandan writers
Rwandan male singers
Living people